Stefan Grodzicki (4 August 1947 – 30 September 1976) was a Polish equestrian. He competed in two events at the 1972 Summer Olympics in Munich, Germany. In the final standings of team mixed equestrianism eventing, Poland finished 10th of the 18 competing countries, 281.60 points behind the winner, Great Britain.

References

1947 births
1976 deaths
Polish male equestrians
Olympic equestrians of Poland
Equestrians at the 1972 Summer Olympics
People from Złotoryja